Otto Dietze (1 July 1833, Chemnitz – 17 October 1890, Riga) was a German-born architect.

Together with Johan Daniel Felsko they worked on the new Riga general plan after demolishing of city walls from 1856 until 1857. He designed several buildings on the new boulevards of Riga. 
He is most noted for his work in Jelgava from 1863–1872 when he was a chief architect of the city. 
He designed the Latvian pastor St. Peter's House (1864), the railway station and residential houses.

In Kuldīga he rebuilt the ancient brick bridge across the Venta River (1874).

Gallery

References

Latvian architects
1833 births
1890 deaths
People from Chemnitz
19th-century Latvian architects